Almada is a city and a municipality in Portugal, located on the southern margin of the Tagus River, on the opposite side of the river from Lisbon. The two cities are connected by the 25 de Abril Bridge. The population of the municipality in 2011 was 174,030, in an area of 70.21 km2. The urbanized core center, the city of Almada proper, had a population of 101,500 in 2001. It makes part of the Lisbon Metropolitan Area.

History
Human presence in the area of Almada dates to the end of the Neolithic period about 5000 years ago; archeological excavations performed in the municipality suggest that non-sedentary nomadic tribes may have occupied this location sporadically. The gradual development of settlement here made its greatest advance with the coming of Islamic civilization, when Muslims constructed a fort at Almada to defend and monitor the entrance to the Tagus River. Lying across the river from Lisbon, the area of Almada was a crossroads for a succession of various peoples who traded along the Tagus, including Phoenicians, Romans and Moors.

As one of the principal Arab military bases along the southern margin of the Tagus, Almada was conquered by the Christian forces of Afonso I with the aid of English Crusaders in 1147. Alongside these Christians there lived many free Moors and Jews, under the royal protection guaranteed them by Afonso I in the charter of 1170 (which applied to all the former Moorish strongholds at Lisbon, Almada, Palmela and Alcácer).

Almada received a foral from King Sancho I in 1190, although it came at a price: Miramolim Jacub-Abu-Jassuf, son of the Moorish leader who had laid siege to Santarém in 1171, was angered by the Christian victories and gathered a large army. He boldly attacked in the north, conquering Alcácer do Sal and Silves, while forcing the residents of Almada, Palmela and other towns along the Tagus into hiding. It would be some time after the death of Sancho before this region would be restored to Portuguese control.
 
When this event occurred with the success of the Reconquista in driving the Muslims out, the Order of Santiago, a donatorio of Almada after 28 October 1186, had an important role in the territory (especially between the Tagus and Sado Rivers). In this role, it facilitated the repopulation of acquired territories and was the beneficiary of the various local economies.

Geography

Although small in area, the city of Almada has a large population. It is bounded to the southeast by Seixal, to the south by Sesimbra, to the west by the Atlantic Ocean and to the north and northeast by the Tagus River. At Cacilhas, its main port, ferry boats transport visitors and local residents across to Lisbon daily, while the 25 de Abril Bridge, which spans the Tagus, is traversed by rail, commercial and personal vehicles daily. Almada is considered a transportation hub and a fast-growing suburb; its coast has several sandy beaches and panoramic vistas.

Located in the district of Setúbal, the municipality includes two cities, Almada and Costa da Caparica, and is divided into five civil parishes:
 Almada, Cova da Piedade, Pragal e Cacilhas
 Caparica e Trafaria
 Charneca de Caparica e Sobreda
 Costa da Caparica
 Laranjeiro e Feijó

International relations

Almada is twinned with:
 Ostrava, Czech Republic
 Porto Amboim, Angola
 Regla, Cuba
 Sal, Cape Verde

Transportation

The 25 de Abril Bridge links Lisbon and Almada, which are on opposite sides of the Tagus river. The municipality is served by a light-rail transit system, the Metro Transportes do Sul, linking it to the suburban rail system (Fertagus) serving Greater Lisbon and the municipality of Seixal.

Sanctuary of Christ the King

Notable citizens

Public service 
 Joan of Portugal (1439–1475) Queen of Castile as the second wife of King Henry IV of Castile.
 Elvira Fortunato (born 1964) a Portuguese scientist, professor in the Materials Science Department at the NOVA University of Lisbon
 Diana Prata (born ca.1975) neuroscientist, head of the Biomedical Neuroscience at the University of Lisbon, brought up in Almada
 Diogo Batáguas (born ca.1984) stand-up comedian and public figure, notable for his monthly YouTube program named "Relatório DB".
 Rita Ferreira (born ca.1993) nuclear medicine resident, notable for her love of sundae caramelo.

Arts 

 Vitor Gonçalves (born 1963) a Portuguese theatre director
 UHF (formed 1970's) rock band formed in Almada
 Anabela Braz Pires (born 1976) known as Anabela, singer and musical theatre actress.
 Xutos & Pontapés, (Wiki PT) (formed 1978) a Portuguese Rock band
 Sara Tavares (born 1978) a Portuguese singer, composer, guitarist and percussionist, family from Almada
 Pedro Barateiro (born 1979) a Portuguese artist
 Patricia Ribeiro (born 1981) transsexual singer, songwriter, dancer and convicted extortionist. 
 Da Weasel (formed 1993) a Portuguese hip-hop band/rock band from Almada
 Aenima (formed 1997) a Portuguese dark wave, rock band 
 Ava Inferi (2005–2013) a Portuguese Doom Metal band

Sport 

 Alfredo Murça (1948–2007) a Portuguese international footballer with nearly 400 club caps
 Rui Eugénio (born 1966) a Portuguese former footballer with over 400 club caps
 Luís Figo (born 1972) known as Figo, former footballer with 570 caps and 127 for Portugal
 Telma Monteiro (born 1985), world champion judoka
 Silvestre Varela (born 1985) a footballer with over 400 club caps and 27 for Portugal
 Carlos Emanuel Soares Tavares (born 1985) known as Carlitos, a footballer with 350 club caps and 32 for Cape Verde
 Aylton Boa Morte (born 1993) a Portuguese footballer with over 350 club caps 
 Mónica Mendes (born 1993) a Portuguese footballer with 51 caps for Portugal women
 Miguel Oliveira (born 1995) a Portuguese professional MotoGP Rider
 Rafael Leão (born 1999) a Portuguese footballer

See also
Almada Fórum

References
Notes

Sources

External links

Almada Municipality
Almada Digital

 
Cities in Portugal
Populated places in Setúbal District
Municipalities of Setúbal District